I'm So Confused is an album by Jonathan Richman, released in 1998.

Production
I'm So Confused was produced by Ric Ocasek. Darryl Jenifer played bass on the album.

Critical reception
The Austin Chronicle opined that Ocasek "takes Richman and drummer Tommy Larkins' two-man-band simplicity and augments it with just the right amount of bass and light keyboards." Entertainment Weekly thought that "for the first time in years, he's shed his grating penchant for writing soft-headed novelty songs in favor of ... grown-up, gently amusing tales that plumb love’s sweet mysteries." Spin concluded that "there's something sad and epic and beautiful about spending a lifetime trying to figure out what it means to be a teen."

AllMusic wrote that Richman's "charming nasal voice seems to have all but disappeared; it's been replaced with a sort of arty croon, as on the title cut and the dour 'Affection'."

Track listing

Personnel
Jonathan Richman - Guitars, Vocals
Tommy Larkins - Drums
Darryl Jenifer - Bass
Edwin Bonilla - Conga Drums on "The Lonely Little Thrift Store"
Steph Dickson, Keren DeBerg - Background Vocals

References

1998 albums
Albums produced by Ric Ocasek
Jonathan Richman albums
Vapor Records albums